Myong Jin Joun (born 1971) is an American lawyer and jurist serving as an associate judge of the Boston Municipal Court. He is the nominee to serve as a United States district judge of the United States District Court for the District of Massachusetts.

Education 

Joun earned a Bachelor of Arts degree from the University of Massachusetts Boston in 1994 and a Juris Doctor from the Suffolk University Law School in 1999.

Career 

From 1999 to 2007, Joun worked as an associate at Howard Friedman P.C. He was a solo practitioner from 2007 to 2014. In 2014, Governor Deval Patrick nominated Joun to serve as an associate judge of the Boston Municipal Court. Joun also served in the United States Army and Massachusetts National Guard. Joun has worked with the American Civil Liberties Union of Massachusetts, the National Lawyers Guild, the Massachusetts Law Reform Institute, the American Bar Foundation and the Massachusetts Bar Foundation.

Nomination to federal district court 

On July 29, 2022, President Joe Biden announced his intent to nominate Joun to serve as a United States district judge of the United States District Court for the District of Massachusetts. On August 1, 2022, his nomination was sent to the Senate. He has been nominated to a seat vacated by Judge George A. O'Toole Jr., who assumed senior status on January 1, 2018. On November 15, 2022, a hearing on his nomination was held before the Senate Judiciary Committee. On December 8, 2022, his nomination was reported out of committee by a 12–10 vote. On January 3, 2023, his nomination was returned to the President under Rule XXXI, Paragraph 6 of the United States Senate. He was renominated on January 23, 2023. On February 9, 2023, his nomination was reported out of committee by a 12–9 vote. His nomination is pending before the United States Senate. If confirmed, he would be the first Asian American man on the federal bench in Massachusetts.

See also 
 List of Asian American jurists

References 

1971 births
Living people
20th-century American lawyers
21st-century American judges
21st-century American lawyers
American jurists of Asian descent
Lawyers from Boston
Massachusetts lawyers
South Korean people
Suffolk University Law School alumni
United States Army soldiers
University of Massachusetts Boston alumni